Rafael "Rafles" Orozco Torres (8 May 1922 – 19 February 2015) was a Mexican footballer, who played as  defender for C.D. Guadalajara from 1943 to 1952.

References

1922 births
2015 deaths
Footballers from Jalisco
C.D. Guadalajara footballers
Association football defenders
Mexican footballers
People from Arandas, Jalisco